On 1 December 2015, a bombing occurred on the Istanbul Metro, Turkey. An explosion caused by a pipe bomb occurred at around 17:15 near Bayrampaşa—Maltepe station in Bayrampaşa, Istanbul, injuring five people.

References

External links

Metro bombing
Metro bombing
December 2015 crimes in Europe
December 2015 events in Turkey
Improvised explosive device bombings in 2015
Metro bombing
Bombing
Terrorist incidents in Turkey in 2015
Terrorist incidents on railway systems in Europe
Terrorist incidents on underground rapid transit systems
Building bombings in Turkey
Attacks in Turkey in 2015